John F. Kennedy High School is a public high school located in Bellmore, New York. It is one of three high schools in the Bellmore-Merrick Central High School District.

As of the 2021–22 school year, the school had an enrollment of 999 students and 78.5 classroom teachers (on an FTE basis), for a student–teacher ratio of 13.2:1. There were 98 students (9.4% of enrollment) eligible for free lunch and 5 (0.5% of students) eligible for reduced-cost lunch.

The school is open during normal school months. Its newspaper is the Cougar Crier.
In local athletics, this school is referred to as Bellmore JFK to avoid confusion with the nearby Plainview JFK.

District
There are four other schools in the Bellmore-Merrick Central High School District: Wellington C. Mepham High School, Sanford H. Calhoun High School, Merrick Avenue Middle School, and Grand Avenue Middle School.
About 6,050 students are enrolled at the school district, with approximately 1,200 students in each school.

Bellmore JFK is known for its men and women's volleyball teams.

Notable alumni 
The Official Alumni Association of the high school is called: Bellmore JFK Alumni, Inc.
The link to the website is here. Link to Alumni that have been inducted to the JFK Hall of Fame is here.

 Tim Canova, politician and law professor 
 Doug Ellin, creator of Entourage
 Paul Feinman (1960–2021), New York State Court of Appeals judge
 Amy Fisher, convicted of the 1992 shooting of wife of her lover
 Bill Freiberger, Emmy-nominated writer and producer of The Simpsons, The PJs, and Drawn Together
Artie Kempner, Director for NFL on Fox and Nascar
 Michael Kors (born 1959), fashion designer
 Paul Krugman (born 1953), economist, Princeton University Professor, and columnist for The New York Times, Nobel Prize in economics
 Steve Levy (born 1965), host of ESPN SportsCenter
 Scott Lipsky (born 1981), tennis player
 Daryl Palumbo, vocalist of Glassjaw and vocalist for Head Automatica
Marc Rowan , (born 1962) Co-Founder Apollo Capital Management, Billionaire Philanthropist 
Noah Rubin (born 1996), tennis player
 Adam Schefter, ESPN football analyst
 Marc Slutsky, musician
 Jason Smilovic, writer and producer
 Laurence Traiger (born 1956), composer and musicologist
Scott Zakarin, film producer

References
Notes

External links 
 John F. Kennedy High School
 Bellmore-Merrick Central School District

Bellmore JFK Alumni, Inc.    http://www.bellmorejfkalumni.org/

Public high schools in New York (state)
Educational institutions established in 1966
Schools in Nassau County, New York
1966 establishments in New York (state)
Monuments and memorials to John F. Kennedy in the United States